Ambrose H. Abbott (ca. 1813–1882) of Augusta, Maine, was a member of the Maine Legislature, serving in the Maine Senate in 1874. He represented the Seventh Senatorial District in the 1874 Senate session, which lasted from January 7 through March 4.  He previously served in the Maine Governor's Council in 1870 and 1873.

Besides serving in the legislature, he was a grocer.

Abbott died March 9, 1882, in Augusta.

References

1813 births
Politicians from Augusta, Maine
Maine state senators
1882 deaths
Members of the Executive Council of Maine
19th-century American politicians